L'Espérance ('The Hope') was a newspaper published in Guinea, appearing in the period shortly after the relaxation of Guinean press laws in 1993. The newspaper was published by the Guinean Red Cross. By 1995 publication of the newspaper was discontinued.

References

Newspapers published in Guinea
French-language newspapers published in Africa
International Red Cross and Red Crescent Movement
1993 establishments in Guinea
Publications established in 1993
Publications disestablished in 1995